Westwood is a commercial and residential neighborhood in the northern central portion of the Westside region of Los Angeles, California. It is the home of the University of California, Los Angeles (UCLA). Bordering the campus on the south is Westwood Village, a major regional district for shopping, dining, movie theaters, and other entertainment.

Wilshire Boulevard through Westwood is a major corridor of condominium towers, on the eastern end and of Class A office towers, on the western end. Westwood also has residential areas of multifamily and single family housing, including exclusive Holmby Hills. The neighborhood was developed starting in 1919, and UCLA opened in 1929, while Westwood Village was built up starting in 1929 through the 1930s.

Geography
According to the Westwood Neighborhood Council, the Westwood Homeowners Association, and the Los Angeles Times Mapping L.A. project, Westwood is bounded by:

Sub-neighborhoods

Westwood Village is immediately south of the UCLA campus, bounded by LeConte, Gayley, Thornton (between Lindbrook and Wilshire: Glendon) and Wilshire Boulevard. Westwood Village north of Wilshire is an on-street shopping, dining and entertainment district that was planned in the 1920s - the second such district ever to be built in the nation's history. It was planned by Janss and businesses started to open in 1929. It was the Westside's busiest such district through the 1980s.

A portion of Holmby Hills, home to the Playboy Mansion, south of Sunset Blvd., east of both Beverly Glen Bl. and Comstock Av., and west of the L.A. Country Club, is within Westwood. The northern section of Holmby Hills is part of Bel Air. Together, Holmby Hills, Bel Air and Beverly Hills form the "Platinum Triangle" of Los Angeles.

North Westwood Village (or North Village) consists mainly of multifamily residential units where many UCLA students live, west of Gayley, north of Weyburn, and east of Veteran aves.

Tehrangeles, also known as "Little Persia", refers to the large number of Persian restaurants, grocery stores, book stores, art galleries, travel agencies, and rug stores along Westwood Boulevard that has served as a cultural hub for the Persian community in Los Angeles since the 1960s.

Climate
Westwood has a Mediterranean climate (Köppen Csb) with dry summers, relatively wet winters, and mild temperatures year-round.

History

Development
Westwood was developed on the lands of the historic Wolfskill Ranch, a  parcel that Arthur Letts, the successful founder of the Broadway, and Bullock's department stores, purchased in 1919. Upon Arthur Lett's death, his son-in-law, Harold Janss, vice president of Janss Investment Company, inherited the land. He began to develop the area and started to advertise for new homes in 1922.

The Los Angeles Times reported the news: "Westwood, the subdivision of the Wolfskill Ranch,  of scenic territory between the city and Santa Monica, is to be opened to homeseekers and investors today by the Janss Investment Company. The tract comprises approximately 1000 residential and business lots, situated west of the Los Angeles Country Club on Santa Monica Boulevard and the Rancho Country Club on Pico Boulevard."

UCLA

Meanwhile, the Southern Branch of the University of California had been established on Vermont Avenue in Los Angeles, where enrollment expanded so rapidly that by 1925 the institution had outgrown the site. The selection of a new campus in the Westwood hills was announced on March 21, 1925. The owners of the estate, the Janss brothers, agreed to sell the property for approximately $1 million ($ million in  dollars), less than one-third the land's value. Municipal bond measures passed by Los Angeles, Santa Monica, Beverly Hills and Venice provided for that amount. Proposition 10, a state bond measure passed that year, provided $3 million for construction. Thus the University of California at Los Angeles was established in Westwood; ground was broken on September 12, 1927, and the campus opened for regular classes on September 20, 1929.

The nation's second planned suburban shopping district
Westwood Village, a planned, 55-acre suburban shopping district immediately south of the UCLA campus, was only the second such district on this scale ever to be built worldwide, preceded only by Country Club Plaza (1922–23) in Kansas City. It with was created by the Janss Investment Company, run by Harold and Edwin Janss and their father, Peter, in the late 1920s as a shopping district and headquarters of the Janss Company. Its boom was complemented by the boom of UCLA which opened in 1929 and served not only faculty, staff and students but also affluent shoppers from the surrounding upscale single-family-home neighborhoods.

Opening in 1929, the design was considered one of the nation's best-planned and beautifully laid out commercial areas. Harold Janss had hired major architects and instructed them to follow a Mediterranean theme, with clay tile roofs, decorative Spanish tile, paseos, patios and courtyards. Buildings at strategic points, including theaters, used towers to serve as beacons for drivers on Wilshire Boulevard. Janss picked the first slate of businesses and determined their location in the neighborhood; the area opened with 34 businesses, and, despite the Great Depression, had 452 businesses in 1939, including Bullock's (Parkinson & Parkinson), Desmond's (Percy Parke Lewis) and Sears department stores, and a Ralphs grocery (Stiles Clements).

1970s–1980s
The architectural style met a turning point in 1970, when a 24-story office building now known as the Oppenheimer Tower was built in the neighborhood and the design of new buildings soon became a blend of styles. The Oppenheimer Tower was used for the primary location in the 1978 episode of Emergency!, "The Steel Inferno". Wilshire Boulevard through Westwood is would become a major corridor of condominium towers, from Westwood Boulevard east towards the Beverly Hills city line, and of Class A office towers, at Westwood Boulevard and westward. The 1980s saw Iranian immigration to the area after the 1979 Iranian Revolution, and the beginnings of the Tehrangeles business corridor along Westwood Boulevard south of Wilshire Boulevard. Westwood Village's popularity as a shopping, dining, and nighttime entertainment district continued to rise, with commercial rents peaking in 1988.

Decline of Westwood Village
The Village suffered a major setback in the late 1980s, when gangs began to frequent the neighborhood and bother visitors; the problems culminated in January 1988 when a gang shootout resulted in the death of a 27-year-old bystander. The neighborhood's well-known bookstores and some movie cinemas began closing with the advent of large chain stores, Amazon.com and multiplex theaters.

On January 30, 1988, gang violence brought nationwide attention to Westwood Village when Karen Toshima, a 27-year-old graphics artist, was killed as she crossed a Village street in a shootout between gang members.  Her killer, Durrell DeWitt Collins, 23, was sentenced to two concurrent terms of 27 years to life in prison. In 2016, he was again denied parole until at least 2021. The episode led to the widespread impression that even affluent Westwood was not immune to the crime wave then ravaging Los Angeles.

The Los Angeles establishment reacted with horror. Newspapers and television headlined the story for days. Police patrols in Westwood tripled, and the L.A.P.D. assigned a 30-member antigang unit to capture Toshima's killer.      — "The Price of Life in Los Angeles: Is one killing in Westwood worse than hundreds in the ghetto?", Margaret Carlson, Time magazine, February 22, 1988

Current status of the Village
A 2014 report for the Westwood Village Improvement Association reported that Westwood Village, although still a busy place, used to be the Westside's dominant retail and entertainment destinations for decades, but no longer is. The Village suffers from deteriorating public spaces, a high number vacancies and—unlike when it was originally master-planned—a mix of tenants that no longer is planned or coordinated. Multiple revitalization efforts over decades were essentially unsuccessful, marred by decades of challenges and failure, and the Village's image and reputation suffered. Even a quarter century later, Los Angeles Magazine referred to the 1988 gang‐related murder of an innocent bystander as a cause of Westwood Village’s "diminished activity". Limited and expensive parking, as ever, remained a problem. Macy's (originally Bullock's) closed in 1999, leaving the district without a department store anchor. In that quarter-century, multiple nearby districts new customers away from the Village, such as Westfield Century City, The Grove, the now-closed Westside Pavilion, and Downtown Santa Monica with its pedestrian mall, shopping mall and pier.

Architecture
Westwood Village was master-planned in the late 1920s and Janss carefully selected not only the architects, but also the style of the buildings and their juxtaposition. Towers were built as landmarks and businesses on corner lots were carefully selected for their attractiveness and as landmarks.

Table of architecturally significant buildings in Westwood Village
Buildings which according to a 1985 study by Gruen and Associates identified the following buildings of historic architectural significance:

Demographics
In 2018, about 50,288 people lived in the 90024 ZIP code, which grossly corresponds to Westwood, according to the Census Bureau's American Community Survey. The 2000 U.S. census counted 47,916 residents in the 3.68-square-mile Westwood neighborhood—or 13,036 people per square mile, an average population density for the city. In 2008, the city estimated that the population had increased to 52,041. The median age for residents was 27, considered young for the city; the percentages of residents aged 19 to 34 was among the county's highest.

The neighborhood was considered moderately diverse ethnically, with a high percentage of Asians and of whites. The breakdown was whites, 62.9%; Asians, 23.1%; Latinos, 7.0%; blacks, 2.0%; and others, 4.9%. Iran (23.5%) and Taiwan (7.3%) were the most common places of birth for the 31.3% of the residents who were born abroad—about the same percentage as in the city at large.

The median yearly household income in 2008 dollars was $68,716, a high figure for Los Angeles. The percentages of households that earned $125,000 yearly and higher or that earned $20,000 or less were high for Los Angeles County. The average household size of two people was low for Los Angeles. Renters occupied 64.1% of the housing stock and house-or-apartment owners held 35.9%. The percentages of never-married men and women were among the county's highest. In 2000 there were 309 families headed by single parents, a low percentage for the city. Five percent of the population had served in the military, a low figure for both the city and the county.

Entertainment and cultural facilities
Besides the many facilities of UCLA itself, cultural and entertainment facilities include:

Historic cinemas
The Village has two historic movie theaters Fox Village Theater (opened 1931, architect Percy Parke Lewis and the Bruin Theater (S. Charles Lee, 1937), which hosted many Hollywood premieres over past decades.

Hammer Museum
The Hammer Museum, which is affiliated with UCLA, is an art museum and cultural center known for its artist-centric and progressive array of exhibitions and public programs. Founded in 1990 by the entrepreneur-industrialist Armand Hammer to house his personal art collection, the museum has since expanded its scope to become "the hippest and most culturally relevant institution in town." Particularly important among the museum's critically acclaimed exhibitions are presentations of both historically over-looked and emerging contemporary artists. The Hammer Museum also hosts over 300 programs throughout the year, from lectures, symposia, and readings to concerts and film screenings. As of February 2014, the museum's collections, exhibitions, and programs are completely free to all visitors.

Geffen Playhouse Theater
The Geffen Playhouse Theater was built in 1929 at 10886 LeConte Avenue as the Masonic Affiliates Club, or the MAC, for students and alumni at UCLA. One of the first dozen structures built in Westwood Village, it was designed by architect Stiles O. Clements.

LDS (Mormon) Temple
The Los Angeles California Temple, the second-largest temple operated by the Church of Jesus Christ of Latter-day Saints, is on Santa Monica Boulevard in Westwood. The temple grounds also includes a Visitors' Center open to the public and the headquarters for the Church's missionary efforts in Los Angeles. The church purchased the land for the temple from silent film star Harold Lloyd in 1937, but did not open the temple until 1956.

The temple grounds are also home to the Los Angeles Regional Family History Center (LARFHC), which is open to the public as well. It is the second-largest branch in the Family History Library system of the LDS Church, and contains more than 100,000 microfiche and 30,000 books.

Parks and recreation
The Westwood Recreation Center is in Westwood. The facility includes barbecue pits, a lighted baseball diamond, lighted outdoor basketball courts, racquetball courts, a children's play area, a community room, an indoor gymnasium with weights, and a picnic table. The center also has Aidan's Place, which opened on December 5, 2001. The place, named after wheelchair-bound Aidan James, is a playground developed for joint use by handicapped and non-handicapped children.

Holmby Park is also in Westwood.

Government and infrastructure
The Los Angeles County Department of Health Services SPA 5 West Area Health Office serves Westwood.

In 2018, Westwood stakeholders voted to subdivide the area into two official neighborhood council districts. Since then the North Westwood Neighborhood Council has represented UCLA, Westwood Village, the North Westwood Village, and Persian Square areas, while the Westwood Neighborhood Council has continued to represent the surrounding residential areas.

Police
The Los Angeles Police Department operates the West Los Angeles Community Police Station at 1663 Butler Avenue, which serves the community.  Law enforcement for the UCLA campus is the responsibility of the UCLA Police Department, a division of the independent, statewide University of California Police Department. As a state police agency, the UCLA PD has full law enforcement powers on and off campus.

Fire and EMS
Fire and emergency medical services are provided by the Los Angeles Fire Department. UCLA Emergency Medical Services, a division of the UCLA Police Department, operates a Basic Life Support ambulance for the UCLA campus and supports LAFD on medical aid calls in the surrounding community.  UCLA also maintains a small fire suppression apparatus staffed by campus fire marshals that responds to university-owned properties and helps the outside community when requested to by LAFD.

Education
Sixty-six percent of Westwood residents aged 25 and older had earned a four-year degree by 2000, a high figure for both the city and the county. The percentages of residents of that age with a master's degree or higher was the third-highest in the county.

Westwood is home to the University of California, Los Angeles (UCLA).

The Los Angeles Unified School District operates public schools. Schools in Westwood are
 Fairburn Avenue Elementary School, LAUSD, 1403 Fairburn Avenue
 Warner Avenue Elementary School, LAUSD, 615 Holmby Avenue
 Sinai Akiba Academy, private elementary, 10400 Wilshire Boulevard
 Saint Paul the Apostle, private elementary, 1536 Selby Avenue
 Ralph Waldo Emerson Middle School, LAUSD, 1660 Selby Avenue

The zoned senior high school is University High School in West Los Angeles.

UCLA Lab School Corinne A. Seeds Campus, formerly the Corinne A. Seeds University Elementary School and renamed in 2009, is the University of California, Los Angeles laboratory school.

The Los Angeles Public Library opened a branch in Westwood in 2005.

Notable residents
Andy Hill (born c. 1950), college basketball player, business executive and public speaker

References

External links

 Comments about living in Westwood
 Westwood crime map and statistics
 Elementary schools: Fairburn Avenue, Warner Avenue 
 History of Westwood Village – Old Postcards
 Birds of Westwood – A guide to birds found on and near the UCLA campus
 Los Angeles Times, Real Estate section, Neighborly Advice column: "[Wilshire Corridor:] "Mini-Manhattan, just west of Los Angeles" (November 14, 2004)
 Los Angeles Times, Real Estate section, Neighborly Advice column: "[Westwood:] That Westside college town" (September 7, 2003)

 
1922 establishments in California
Neighborhoods in Los Angeles
Populated places established in 1922
Westside (Los Angeles County)
Edge cities in Greater Los Angeles
Shopping districts and streets in Greater Los Angeles